Snow Hill Tunnel may refer to:

Snow Hill tunnel (London), a railway tunnel in central London between Farringdon and City Thameslink stations
Snow Hill tunnel (Birmingham), a railway tunnel in central Birmingham between Snow Hill and Moor Street stations